Austropelor is an extinct genus of possible chigutisaurid temnospondyl from Early Jurassic (Lower Pliensbachian stage) of Australia. Fossil remains were found at Marburg Sandstone Formation. Austropelor was originally described as part of a right maxilla, yet the holotype, No. F2628, seems to be more likely a left amphibian mandible. This genus was rather controversial at his original description, as, back then was the only jurassic labyrinthodont know, until the description of Siderops. After the original paper, the Marburg Sandstone Formation was regarded as of Late Triassic age with the overlying Walloon Coal Measures of possible lower jurassic age. Yet was latter interpreted as Lower Jurassic in age, likely "Middle Liassic" (=Pliensbachian).

Austropelor holotype consists of three conjoined pieces (-100 mm) with alveoli lacking teeth, representing segment of a left mandibular ramus with clear amphibian characters. Affinities of the genus revelated relationships with brachyopoids, as well possibly a Metoposaurs.

References

Jurassic temnospondyls
Prehistoric amphibians of Australia
Chigutisaurids
Early Jurassic amphibians